Enchant is an American neo-progressive rock band, formed in 1989. Their music is characterized by ambitious lyrics and melodies along with harmonic experimentation.

History
Enchant's origins reach back to the end of the 1980s when the band was known as Mae Dae. In 1993 they went into the studio to record "A Blueprint of the World". This was produced by Paul A Schmidt. The band unhappy with the production called on Steve Rothery of Marillion to help co-produce the record with Douglas Ott and Paul Craddick. Rothery added some guitars and remixed some songs. A small German label, Dream Circle, had secured the rights for this album. The band toured Europe in 1993, and the album was later re-released with an extended booklet and a second disc with demos from their first album.

Wounded (1996) helped them attract new fans. Time Lost (1997) was released for a tour with Dream Theater. It had four new tracks and previously unreleased material. Break (1998) was promoted live on stage with Spock's Beard and later with Marillion. These albums marked a departure from their first album.

Juggling 9 or Dropping 10 was released in 2000. Two band members left after the album was finished. Blink of an Eye and Tug of War reinforced the band's status as a serious band. These albums opened the band's road for touring in Germany together with Spock's Beard and the California Guitar Trio. Their live album, Live at Last was released as a double CD and a double DVD set, with over 20 songs some dating back to 1993.

The band, after a long break, recorded a new album titled The Great Divide which was released in 2014.

Lineup
Current members
 Doug Ott – guitars, backing vocals, occasional bass and keyboards , lead vocals 
 Ted Leonard – lead vocals, occasional guitars and bass 
 Ed Platt – bass 
 Sean Flanegan – drums, percussion 
 Bill Jenkins – keyboards, backing vocals 

Former members
 Paul Craddick – drums, occasional keyboards, bass and guitars 
 Mike "Benignus" Geimer – keyboards 
 Brian Cline – bass, lead and backing vocals 
 Phil Bennett – keyboards

Discography

Studio albums
 A Blueprint of the World (1993)
 Wounded (1996)
 Time Lost (1997)
 Break (1998)
 Juggling 9 Or Dropping 10 (2000)
 Blink of an Eye (2002)
 Tug of War (2003)
 The Great Divide (2014)
 A Dream Imagined Box Set (2018) The complete collection 1994 - 2014)

Live albums
 Live at Last (2004)

Videography
 Live At Last (2004)

References

External links
 
 
 

Musical groups established in 1989
Musical groups from San Francisco
Progressive rock musical groups from California
Inside Out Music artists